Black Rock Mountain (frequently misspelled Blackrock Mountain) is a mountain on the eastern fringe of the Canadian Rockies in Alberta, Canada. Black Rock Mountain was descriptively named.

It is located on the north-eastern edge of Kananaskis Country, almost directly west of Calgary.

The mountain is a popular hike for locals, as it offers an unimpeded view of the prairies. A lookout was built by Alberta Forest Service on the summit in 1929, and was in service until 1959.

Black Rock Mountain was named in 1958 for its black appearance, particularly from the east.

References

Kananaskis Country Trail Guide vol. 1 - Gillean Daffern

Two-thousanders of Alberta
Alberta's Rockies